The UNOH 200 is a NASCAR Camping World Truck Series race that takes place in August at Bristol Motor Speedway in Bristol, Tennessee. It was usually held on the Wednesday night prior to the NASCAR Cup Series Saturday night race, the Bass Pro Shops NRA Night Race; though in 2018, the race took place on Thursday night and was broadcast in primetime on Fox. When first held in 1995, the race was 150 laps. It was increased to 200 laps the following year, and has remained at that distance since. There were no Truck races held at BMS between 2000 and 2002. Starting in the 2019 event, it became the first race of the playoffs, while in 2020 it switched to the final race in the round of 8.

Past winners

1998, 2004, 2008, 2010, 2012, 2015, & 2017: These races were extended due to a NASCAR Overtime finish.
2014: Race postponed to Thursday morning due to rain.

Multiple winners (drivers)

Multiple winners (teams)

Manufacturer wins

References

External links
 

NASCAR Truck Series races
 
August sporting events
Annual sporting events in the United States
Recurring sporting events established in 1995
1995 establishments in Tennessee